In the 2004 United Andhra Pradesh Assembly election, the Congress had swept the state, winning 185 of the 294 seats in the Assembly.

The Congress' pre-poll alliance partners CPI, CPI(M) and TRS also did well winning 15 and 26 seats respectively, taking the UPA tally to 226. As the leader of the Congress Legislature Party, Y.S. Rajasekhara Reddy was invited to form the Government by Governor S.S. Barnala.
Expectedly, the Government lasted the full term of 5 years and the tenure of the Legislative Assembly was due to expire on 30 May 2009. The Election Commission of India (ECI) decided to hold the Assembly elections along with the general election. The election in each Assembly constituency (AC) was held in the same phase as the election to the corresponding Parliamentary constituency that the AC falls under.

Results

Results by party

Results by district

Results by constituency

References 

State Assembly elections in Andhra Pradesh
2000s in Andhra Pradesh
2004 State Assembly elections in India